Lawrence Van Huizen (30 July 1930 – 17 August 2019) was a Malaysian field hockey player. He competed in the men's tournament at the 1964 Summer Olympics.

References

External links

1930 births
2019 deaths
Malaysian male field hockey players
Olympic field hockey players of Malaysia
Field hockey players at the 1964 Summer Olympics
Place of birth missing
Asian Games medalists in field hockey
Asian Games bronze medalists for Malaysia
Medalists at the 1962 Asian Games
Field hockey players at the 1962 Asian Games